Malacolimax tenellus (lemon slug) is a species of air-breathing land slug, a shell-less terrestrial gastropod mollusk in the family Limacidae.

Description

Habitat
This species is known to live in a number of countries and areas:
 Czech Republic – least concern (LC)
 Ukraine
 Great Britain
 Ireland
 Pyrenees
 Croatia
 Romania

Ecology 
 
This species thrive in woodland.

Parasites of Malacolimax tenellus include:
 Elaphostrongylus spp.

References

External links 

 http://www.marcosalemi.com/malacolimax-tenellus/

Limacidae
Molluscs of Europe
Gastropods described in 1774
Taxa named by Otto Friedrich Müller